The Kyo Kara Maoh! anime series is based on the light novel series of the same name written by Tomo Takabayashi. It was directed by Junji Nishimura, animated by Studio Deen, and was produced by NHK. The first two seasons ran from April 3, 2004 to February 25, 2006. In 2007, they made a five-part OVA tittled Kyo Kara Maoh! R, with each episode released separately directly to DVD. In 2008, the series was renewed for a third season which ran from April 3, 2008 to February 19, 2009.

The first two seasons were broadcast in America on ImaginAsian. The third season and OVA have been licensed for English release by Discotek.

Episode list

Season 1
Opening theme song:  by The Stand Up

Ending theme song:  by The Stand Up

Season 2
Opening theme song:  by The Stand Up

Ending theme song:  by BON'Z

OVA

Opening theme song:  by The Stand Up

Ending theme song:  by The Stand Up

Season 3 
Opening theme song:  by Yoshida Shougo with M-Tone

Ending theme song: "Going" by Yoshida Jungo

References

Kyo Kara Maoh